Aake is a 2017 Indian Kannada language neo noir horror film directed by K. M. Chaitanya. It features Sharmiela Mandre and Chiranjeevi Sarja in the lead. Achyuth Kumar and Prakash Belawadi play the supporting roles.Screenplay was written by Sunanda and Carl Austin.

The project marks the Bollywood production and distribution company Eros International's entry into Kannada cinema. The film is produced by Nakshatra Productions, United Kingdom for KS films.The original score and soundtrack for the film was composed by Gurukiran in London. The cinematography was done by UK based Ian Howes.

The film is a British production, made with the best of technicians from United Kingdom and Karnataka.

The movie is an official remake of the 2015 Tamil movie Maya. It is the second collaboration of executive producer Yogish Dwarakish -director Chaitanya- hero Chiranjeevi trio after Aatagara. The movie marked the entry of Eros International in Kannada film industry. This was also the last Kannada movie to be released before the implementation of GST.

Plot
The film runs on two seemingly separate plots simultaneously. In one, a single mother in Bengaluru is trying to make a living out of her floundering acting career. In the second, an artist is in London assigned to draw illustrations for a book about a ghost that haunts a locked out mental asylum.

It is only towards the end that the two plots merge and the audience gets to understand the suspense and the missing blocks.

Cast
 Sharmiela Mandre as Sharmila
 Chiranjeevi Sarja as Arjun/Shiva
 Achyuth Kumar as Madan
 Prakash Belawadi as PK
 Sneha Acharya as Swathi
 Balaji Manohar

Reception
The movie received positive reviews from all quarters. The Times of India gave the movie 3.5 stars and praised its script saying "The biggest victory for Aake is the script, which lingers on in one's mind, in which you try to join the dots even much after the film's ended. Deccan Chronicle gave the movie 3 stars. Praising its technical brilliance , it said "Aake has an imaginary and suspense elements to builds the tension till her real face is revealed. It is the making and the technical work capturing the London's nearby creepy forest area in the dark which makes it an interesting watch". Filmetriks said it was better than its original Maya. The newsminute too spoke high of the movie – "What works for Aake is that the fundamentals are all done right. So, the camera stays close-in and tightly focused, keeping an almost claustrophobic view on the film’s protagonists and antagonists. This helps ratchet the tension higher, as you’re constantly wondering what's lingering just outside the frame.The film’s soundscape is also sharply focused for the most part, staying away from the kind of cacophonous excess that turns many horror films into unintentional comedies.".

Soundtrack

The film's score and soundtrack were composed by Gurukiran. The Background Score was much appreciated.

References

External links

 

2017 films
2017 horror films
2010s Kannada-language films
Indian horror films
Films shot in London
Kannada remakes of Tamil films
Films scored by Gurukiran
Films set in a movie theatre
Films set in forests
Indian horror film remakes
Indian neo-noir films
Films directed by K. M. Chaitanya

kn:ಆಕೆ